Gabriel Luna (born December 5, 1982) is an American actor and producer. He is known for his roles as Robbie Reyes / Ghost Rider on the ABC action superhero series Marvel's Agents of S.H.I.E.L.D., Tony Bravo on the El Rey Network drama series Matador, Paco Contreras on the ABC crime drama series Wicked City, Rev-9 in the Terminator film Terminator: Dark Fate (2019), and Tommy in the HBO post-apocalyptic drama series The Last of Us. He has also starred in the films Bernie (2011), Balls Out (2014), Freeheld (2015), Gravy (2015), and Transpecos (2016).

Early life
Gabriel Isaac Luna was born in Austin, Texas, on December 5, 1982, the son of Deborah Ann (née Perez) and Gabriel Lopez Luna. Luna's parents were both of Mexican descent. His father died at the age of 20, three months prior to Luna's birth, and he was raised by his mother. He attended St. Edward's University in Austin, where he made his stage debut as Romeo in a production of Romeo and Juliet, and graduated in 2005.

Career
Luna made his screen acting debut as Kristofer Rostropovich in the drama film Fall to Grace, which premiered at South by Southwest in March 2005. He then provided voice-over work for the science fiction video game BlackSite: Area 51, which was released in November 2007. Luna is a founding member of the Austin-based Paper Chairs Theatre Company. On stage in Austin, Luna has portrayed Sergei Maxudov in Black Snow (2009), the title character in Orestes (2009), and Clov in Endgame (2010). For these three performances, he received the Austin Critics Table Best Lead Actor Award in 2010.

Luna then starred as the lead character, Nate Hitchins, in the drama film Dance with the One, which premiered at South by Southwest in March 2010. The following year, he had a supporting role in the black comedy film Bernie, directed by Richard Linklater, which premiered at the Los Angeles Film Festival in June 2011. Luna's television credits include minor roles on Fox's serial drama Prison Break (2008), HBO's television film Temple Grandin (2010), Fox's drama-thriller Touch (2013), and CBS' action procedural drama NCIS: Los Angeles (2013).

In 2014, he was cast in the leading role of Tony Bravo on the El Rey Network television series Matador. The series premiered in July 2014 and ran for one season of 13 episodes, ending that October. That same year, he co-starred as Vinnie in the sports comedy Balls Out, which premiered at the Tribeca Film Festival in April 2014. Luna next recurred as Miguel Gilb, a former lover of Taylor Kitsch's character, on the second season of the HBO anthology drama series True Detective, appearing in 3 episodes. He then co-starred in the Julianne Moore and Elliot Page-led drama film Freeheld, directed by Peter Sollett, which premiered at the Toronto International Film Festival in September 2015.

Luna subsequently had a supporting role in the comedy film Gravy, directed by James Roday, which was released in October 2015. He was then cast as Paco Contreras, a detective searching for a serial killer on the Sunset Strip, on the ABC crime drama series Wicked City. The series premiered in October 2015, but was cancelled following its third episode; the remaining episodes were later released through Hulu.

The following year, he starred as border patrol agent Lance Flores in the thriller film Transpecos, opposite Clifton Collins, Jr. and Johnny Simmons. The film had its premiere at South by Southwest in March 2016. Luna next appeared as motorcycle racer Eddie Hasha in the Discovery Channel miniseries Harley and the Davidsons. In July of the same year, it was announced that he would join the cast of Agents of S.H.I.E.L.D. in season 4 as Robbie Reyes / Ghost Rider. He was nominated for Choice TV: Action Actor at the 2017 Teen Choice Awards for his role as Ghost Rider. Luna will have a supporting role as Mr. Lawrence in the coming-of-age film Hala, alongside Jack Kilmer and Anna Chlumsky. In April 2018, he was cast as the villainous Rev-9 Terminator in Terminator: Dark Fate.

In 2019, it was announced that Luna would be reprising his role of Robbie Reyes / Ghost Rider from Agents of S.H.I.E.L.D. in a television series centred on the character which will be released on Hulu to debut in 2020. On September 25, it was reported that Hulu had decided not to go forward on the series.

In April 2021, it was announced that Luna will play Tommy Miller in the HBO television adaptation of The Last of Us opposite Pedro Pascal.

Personal life
Luna married Romanian actress Smaranda Ciceu on February 20, 2011. They reside in Los Angeles.

Filmography

Films

Television

Stage

Video games

Awards and nominations

References

External links
 
 

21st-century American male actors
American male film actors
American male actors of Mexican descent
American male stage actors
American male television actors
American male voice actors
Film producers from Texas
Hispanic and Latino American male actors
Living people
Male actors from Austin, Texas
People from Austin, Texas
St. Edward's University alumni
Year of birth missing (living people)